Lythe is a village and civil parish in North Yorkshire, England.

Lythe may also refer to:

 Lythe, an alternative name for a type of fish, also known as pollock

People with the surname
Ben Lythe, former professional rugby league footballer
Tim Lythe (born 1980), New Zealand cricketer